George Meares,  (June 1825 – 8 December 1903) was Mayor of Melbourne 1880 and 1881, and a member of the Victorian Legislative Council 1882 to 1886.

Meares was the son of George Rochfort Meares, of County Westmeath, Ireland, and emigrated to Australia, arriving in Sydney in 1847 and moving to Melbourne in 1852. He was Mayor of Melbourne in 1880 and 1881, and a commissioner and member of the executive committee for the Melbourne International Exhibition (1880). He married in 1864 Miss Sarah Brooker Dixon, and was created C.M.G. in 1882.

Meares represented North Yarra Province in the Victorian Legislative Council from December 1882 to September 1886.

Meares died in Malvern, Victoria on 8 December 1903; he had three sons, and three daughters, his wife died in 1875. He was the grandfather of Ainslie Meares.

Further reading

References

 

1825 births
1903 deaths
People from County Westmeath
Members of the Victorian Legislative Council
Mayors and Lord Mayors of Melbourne
Irish emigrants to colonial Australia
19th-century Australian politicians
Drapers